The 16th New York State Legislature, consisting of the New York State Senate and the New York State Assembly, met from November 6, 1792, to March 12, 1793, during the sixteenth year of George Clinton's governorship, in New York City.

Background
Under the provisions of the New York Constitution of 1777, the State Senators were elected on general tickets in the senatorial districts, and were then divided into four classes. Six senators each drew lots for a term of 1, 2, 3 or 4 years and, beginning at the election in April 1778, every year six Senate seats came up for election to a four-year term. Assemblymen were elected countywide on general tickets to a one-year term, the whole assembly being renewed annually.

In March 1786, the Legislature enacted that future Legislatures meet on the first Tuesday of January of each year unless called earlier by the governor. No general meeting place was determined, leaving it to each Legislature to name the place where to reconvene, and if no place could be agreed upon, the Legislature should meet again where it adjourned.

On February 7, 1791, the Legislature re-apportioned the Senate and Assembly districts, according to the figures of the 1790 United States Census.

State Senator Peter Schuyler died on January 4, 1792, leaving a vacancy in the Western District.

At this time the politicians were divided into two opposing political parties: the Federalists and the Democratic-Republicans. Since the first appearance of the political parties, many politicians changed sides for a variety of reasons, but the highly controversial gubernatorial election of 1792 re-aligned the politicians more clearly.

Elections
The State election was held from April 24 to 26, 1792. Gov. George Clinton and Lt. Gov. Pierre Van Cortlandt were re-elected to a sixth term after the Canvass Committee rejected the votes of Otsego, Clinton and Tioga counties on technicalities.

Henry Cruger, John Schenck, Selah Strong (all three Southern D.), John Livingston, Robert Woodworth (both Eastern D.) and Assemblyman Joseph Hasbrouck (Middle D.) were elected to full terms in the Senate. Assemblyman John Frey was elected to fill the vacancy in the Western District.

Sessions
This time, the Legislature was called to meet early to elect presidential electors. Both Houses met at Federal Hall in New York City; assembled a quorum on November 6, 1792; and adjourned on March 12, 1793.

On November 20, 1792, the Legislature chose 12 presidential electors: William Floyd, Samuel Osgood, Edward Savage, Stephen Ward, John Bay, Jesse Woodhull, David Van Ness, Johannes Bruyn, Volkert Veeder, Abraham Yates Jr., Samuel Clark and Abraham Ten Eyck. All were Democratic-Republicans, elected on the first ballot in both Houses, and all cast their votes for George Washington and Gov. George Clinton.

After the 1790 United States Census, Congress re-apportioned the seats, increasing New York's representation from 6 to 10 seats. This required the Legislature to re-apportion the congressional districts in the State what was belatedly done on December 18, 1792. Subsequently, the congressional elections were held in January 1793.

State Senate

Districts
The Southern District (8 seats) consisted of Kings, New York, Queens, Richmond, Suffolk and Westchester counties.
The Middle District (6 seats) consisted of Dutchess, Orange and Ulster counties.
The Eastern District (5 seats) consisted of Washington, Clinton, Columbia and Rensselaer counties.
The Western District (5 seats) consisted of Albany, Montgomery, Herkimer, Ontario, Otsego, Saratoga and Tioga counties.

Note: There are now 62 counties in the State of New York. The counties which are not mentioned in this list had not yet been established, or sufficiently organized, the area being included in one or more of the abovementioned counties.

Members
The asterisk (*) denotes members of the previous Legislature who continued in office as members of this Legislature. Joseph Hasbrouck and John Frey changed from the Assembly to the Senate.

The party affiliations follow the vote on the contested election of John Livingston. The Democratic-Republicans voted to seat Livingston, affirming that the decision of the Canvass Committee was final for both the governor's and the senators' vote. The Federalists voted against this, supporting the claim of Thomas Jenkins, the Federalist candidate who had lost the election after the rejection of the ballots from Clinton County, affirming that under the Constitution it was the right and duty of the Senate to revise the decision of the Canvass Committee concerning the election of senators.

Employees
Clerk: Abraham B. Bancker

State Assembly

Districts

The City and County of Albany (7 seats)
Columbia County (6 seats)
Dutchess County (7 seats)
Herkimer County (1 seat)
Kings County (1 seat)
Montgomery County) (4 seats)
The City and County of New York (7 seats)
Ontario County (1 seat)
Orange County (3 seats)
Otsego County (1 seat)
Queens County (3 seats)
Rensselaer County (5 seats)
Richmond County (1 seat)
Saratoga County (4 seats)
Suffolk County (4 seats)
Tioga County (1 seat)
Ulster County (5 seats)
Washington and Clinton counties (4 seats)
Westchester County (5 seats)

Note: There are now 62 counties in the State of New York. The counties which are not mentioned in this list had not yet been established, or sufficiently organized, the area being included in one or more of the abovementioned counties.

Assemblymen
The asterisk (*) denotes members of the previous Legislature who continued as members of this Legislature.

Employees
Clerk: John McKesson
Sergeant-at-Arms: Robert Hunter
Doorkeeper:Richard Ten Eyck

Notes

Sources
The New York Civil List compiled by Franklin Benjamin Hough (Weed, Parsons and Co., 1858) [see pg. 108 for Senate districts; pg. 114 for senators; pg. 148f for Assembly districts; pg. 167 for assemblymen; pg. 320 and 323 for presidential election]
Election result Assembly, Dutchess Co. at project "A New Nation Votes", compiled by Phil Lampi, hosted by Tufts University Digital Library
Election result Assembly, Herkimer Co. at project "A New Nation Votes"
Election result Assembly, Kings Co. at project "A New Nation Votes"
Election result Assembly, Montgomery Co. at project "A New Nation Votes"
Election result Assembly, Orange Co. at project "A New Nation Votes"
Election result Assembly, Otsego Co. at project "A New Nation Votes"
Election result Assembly, Rensselaer Co. at project "A New Nation Votes"
Election result Assembly, Ulster Co. at project "A New Nation Votes"

1792 in New York (state)
1793 in New York (state)
016